Wolverhampton Street School was a secondary school located in Dudley, Worcestershire (now West Midlands), England.

The school was opened in 1880 on Wolverhampton Street in the west of Dudley town centre, an area which was heavily developed for housing during the 19th century to accommodate workers drawn to the town as a result of the Industrial Revolution.

The school's most notable pupil, Duncan Edwards, started in 1948 and left in 1952. He was a highly successful member of the school's football team and also represented the England team at schoolboy level, as well as several other teams outside the school. He signed for Manchester United on leaving school and within three years had gained full international recognition, regarded by many as the finest footballer of the decade. He was capped 18 times by England and gaining two Football League championship medals with Manchester United before he died in February 1958, aged 21, from injuries sustained in the Munich air disaster.

By the start of the 1960s, the Wolverhampton Street School buildings were becoming increasingly dilapidated and unsuitable for modern standards. In response to this, Dudley council drew up plans to relocate the school to a new site. Construction work began in 1963 on a new school on Wrens Hill Road, which runs between the Wren's Nest and Priory estates approximately one mile to the north of Dudley town centre. The new school was opened in April 1965 and named Wren's Nest Secondary School, becoming Mons Hill School a decade later. This school in turn closed in July 1990, after only 25 years in use, with pupils and staff being split between Castle High and The Coseley School and the Mons Hill buildings being taken over by Dudley College.

Meanwhile, the Wolverhampton Street School was demolished in 1966 and the site redeveloped as a public car park, although the schoolhouse at the rear of where the school building once stood remains standing to this day.

Defunct schools in the Metropolitan Borough of Dudley
Educational institutions established in 1880
1880 establishments in England
Educational institutions disestablished in 1965
1965 disestablishments in England
Demolished buildings and structures in the West Midlands (county)
Buildings and structures demolished in 1966